Albert Edward Richardson may refer to:
Albert Richardson (architect) (1880–1964), English architect
Albert E. Richardson (inventor), English inventor who designed the first practical Teasmade

See also
 Albert Richardson (disambiguation)